Wilhelm Robert Fliess (29 December 1895 – 9 May 1970) was a German-American physician and psychoanalyst. He was the son of Wilhelm Fliess, a controversial otolaryngologist whose pseudoscientific theories influenced Sigmund Freud. He coined the term ambulatory psychosis. He wrote about sexual abuse and hinted that his father had abused him.

He immigrated to the United States in 1933 and worked as a physician. His cousin Beate Hermelin was a German-born experimental psychologist, who worked in the UK.

He died of liver cancer in 1970.

Select bibliography
Psychoanalytic Series, Volume 1: Erogeneity and Libido : Addenda to the Theory of the Psychosexual Development of the Human
Psychoanalytic Series, Volume 2: Ego and Body Ego: Contributions to Their Psychoanalytic Psychology
Psychoanalytic Series, Volume 3: Symbol, Dream and Psychosis

References

External links
 

1890s births
1970 deaths
American psychoanalysts
Analysands of Siegfried Bernfeld
Analysands of Ruth Mack Brunswick
Jewish emigrants from Nazi Germany to the United States
Jewish American scientists
German psychoanalysts
Deaths from liver cancer
20th-century American Jews